Ilia State University ISU (Georgian: ილიას სახელმწიფო უნივერსიტეტი) was founded in 2006 as a result of a merger of six different academic institutions with long and varied histories. Currently ISU is one of the leading research and educational institutions in Georgia.

History

Ilia State University (ISU), located in Tbilisi, is a flagship public research and comprehensive higher education institution in the South Caucasus which focuses on scientific advancement and transferring top notch knowledge to facilitate societal development.

Established in 2006 as a merger of six different institutions, each having a long history and a diverse institutional profile, Ilia State University justly occupies the top position among research universities in South Caucasus.

ISU's mission revolves around three main principles: Unity of Teaching and Research, Unity of Liberal and Specialized Education, and Unity of Universal and Local

Its 4 faculties (Faculty of Arts and Sciences, Faculty of Natural Sciences and Medicine, Faculty of Business, Technology and Education, and School of Law) offer distinctive training in their respective directions and along with 30 large and small scale research institutes, centers and stations – create in-depth research opportunities in social sciences, humanities, business, law, life sciences, earth sciences, and hard sciences.

ISU  has secured unique position in Georgia’s educational system for its contribution to science popularization, boosting entrepreneurial ecosystem of the country and actively carrying out social responsibility projects. With the highest competition rate for PhD programs in the nation, extensive international ties, around 16,000 students, over 1,500 highly qualified academic and research staff, and with renovated research infrastructure in several Georgia’s regions, ISU has become one of the most desirable universities to study and work for in the country.

Study

4 faculties of Ilia State University offer distinctive training in their respective directions and along with 30 large and small scale research institutes, centers and stations – create in-depth research opportunities in social sciences, humanities, business, law, life sciences, earth sciences, and hard sciences.

 Faculty of Arts and Sciences - Faculty of Arts and Sciences is one of the largest and oldest schools of ISU. The faculty offers highly reputable academic programs on all 3 levels (Bachelor’s, Master’s, and Doctoral) including in Liberal Arts, Philosophy, Education, Political Science, International Relations, Psychology, Sociology, European Studies, History, Foreign Languages, Theatre Studies, Music, Religion Studies, Public Policy, Soviet Studies, Archeology, Art Studies, Medieval Studies, Social Work and other programs covering the fields of Social Sciences, Humanities and Arts.
 Faculty of Natural Sciences and Medicine - Faculty of Natural Sciences and Medicine is a research intensive school offering a wide diversity of top quality academic programs. It implements BA, MA and Ph.D. programs in Physics and Astronomy, Mathematics, Biology, Neurosciences and Biochemistry, Ecology and Genetics, Electrical and Computer Engineering, Nutrition Science, Sustainable Natural and Forest Resources Management, New Materials for Nanoengineering, Energy and Mineral Resources Management and Sustainable Development, Green Architecture and Software Engineering. In 2019 the faculty launched Medical Doctor (MD) Educational Program.The faculty holds top positions in Caucasus for its research in astronomy and astrophysics, neurobiology, ecology, genetics, and evolutionary studies. Basic and applied research is performed in a number of research laboratories and facilities located both on campus and in various regions of Georgia.
 Faculty of Business, Technology and Education - Faculty of Business, Technology and Education, restructured in 2019, unites over 7,000 students within its undergraduate and graduate programs. The Faculty unites the Business School, the School of Technology and the School of Education.United under the umbrella of the new faculty students are able to benefit from the synergy of the three increasingly interconnected academic fields, implement high-tech projects jointly at the university labs, as well as begin startups and acquire versatile knowledge and skills to become successful freelancers. The hands-on approach and entrepreneurial spirit is supported by engaging students in real-work environment in the modern labs, research activities and offering practical experience in cooperation with Georgian and international industries and educational institutions.
 School of Law - The law school runs the following degree programs: Bachelor of Laws (LLB), Master of Private (Business) Law (LLM), Master of Public Law and Policy and Master in Criminal Law.The faculty unites seasoned lawyers from all walks of life: judges adjudicating cases in common courts or the Constitutional Court of Georgia, successful in-house and litigation lawyers, human rights defenders, public prosecutors and women’s right activists. The goal of the School of Law is to produce not only successful lawyers, but all-round professionals who are ready to pursue successful careers in different sectors.

Research
The university operates 25 research institutes, centers and laboratories dispersed across the country.
 Institute of Botany
 Institute of Applied Physics
 Institute of Applied Psychology
 Institute of Earth Sciences
 Institute of Zoology
 Institute of Ecology
 Institute of Theoretical Physics
 International School for Caucasus Studies
 Center of Linguistic Research
 Institute for Modernity Studies
 Language Didactics Research Centre
 Dimitri Uznadze Institute of Psychology
 Research Centre for Semiotics
 Laboratory of Social Studies
 Institute for Fundamental and Interdisciplinary Mathematics Research
 Institute of Chemical Biology
 Institute of Comparative Literature
 Tengiz Oniani laboratory of Sleep-Wakefulness
 Institute of Medical Research
 Art Research Institute
 G. Tsereteli Institute of Oriental Studies
 Institute of Politology
 Savle Tsereteli Institute of Philosophy
 Institute of Biophysics
 4D Research Institute

International relations

Ilia State University is a member of the following networks and organizations:

	Association “Rondine Cittadella della Pace” 
	International Association of Universities – IAU 
	Association “Österreichisches Sprachdiplom  Deutsch ”- ÖSD
	European Cooperation in the Field of Science and Technology - COST 
	European Universities Association - EUA 
	European Network of Occupational Therapy (ENOTHE)
	Francophone Universities Agency (AUF)

The University has established partnership relations with different education institutions abroad, some at university others at faculty or individual level. The list includes:

	University of Cambridge (UK),
	Berkley Laboratory (USA), 
	International Centre for Theoretical Physics (Italy),
	University of Michigan (USA), 
	Montpellier University (France), 
	Pedagogical University of Italy (Italy), 
	Suleiman Demirely University (Turkey), 
	University of Austria (Australia), 
	University of Bonn (Germany), 
	University of Fribourg (Switzerland), 
	Harvard University (USA),

Coat of Arms description

Four field « European » shield.

On the first azure field, six silver (white) open books signify the first six schools and schools of the Ilia State University while establishing. Books bear inscriptions of the three freedoms that lie at the heart of the University: academic freedom, freedom of conscience and freedom of choice.

The second field bears a large purple cross forming four parts with Bolnuri-Katskhuri crosses within. The Georgian National Flag signifies the State status of the University.

The third field with two half silver and half purple crossed keys of Andrew (knowledge keys) signify that the University holds the methods of educations.

On fourth azure (blue) field three polecat (ermine) fur welted purple academic caps signify the past of the two higher education institutions, their merger and the future of the newly formed University.

Beneath the shield of the coat of arms, the motto ribbon bears the Latin inscription « LIGAMUS», signifying «We Unite» i.e. the University's aspiration to unite research and education, bring together existing knowledge, creating new understanding and passing it on to students and society

References

External links

 
Education in Tbilisi
Buildings and structures in Tbilisi
2006 establishments in Georgia (country)